Especially for You is Cilla Black's eleventh solo studio album, released in 1980. This was her first recording project to be undertaken after the completion of her 15-year contract with the EMI group.

Overview
The venture was notably produced by Bruce Welch for Cilla Black Ltd and licensed to K-tel International. Recording sessions for the album were held at the legendary Abbey Road Studios where Black had recorded many of her earlier hit singles. The album consisted of some of Black's favourite songs from the 1970s (or as she referred to them on the album sleeve "modern standards"). The TV-advertised album was eventually certified silver by the BPI having sold over 60,000 units.

Re-release
In 1988, the album was repackaged as Love Songs and released by K-tel International on CD format but was only available for a limited time as the label shutdown. The budget-label Pickwick Group then re-issued the album on CD in 2005, this release included the original artwork and title.

On 7 September 2009, K-Tel (UK) released a special edition of the album exclusively to digital download. This re-issue features all of the album's original recordings plus two rare bonus tracks which includes a rendition of The Beatles' song "The Fool on the Hill" and Black's 1980s TV theme tune "Surprise, Surprise". A digital booklet containing original album artwork, detailed track information and rare photographs was made available from iTunes with purchases of the entire album re-issue.

Track listing
Side one
 "Baby Don't Change Your Mind" (Van McCoy) – 3:03
 "Sometimes When We Touch" (Dan Hill, Barry Mann) – 4:04
 "Just the Way You Are" – 3:54 (Billy Joel)
 "Talking in Your Sleep" (Roger Cook, Bobby Wood) – 3:03
 "You Don't Bring Me Flowers" (Alan Bergman, Marilyn Bergman, Neil Diamond) – 3:15
 "How Deep Is Your Love" (Barry Gibb, Robin Gibb, Maurice Gibb) – 3:51
 "Bright Eyes" (Mike Batt) – 4:00
 "Don't Cry for Me Argentina" (Andrew Lloyd Webber, Tim Rice) – 5:53

Side two
 "When Will I See You Again" (Kenny Gamble, Leon Huff) – 2:58 
 "You Needed Me" (Randy Goodrum) – 3:27
 "If You Leave Me Now" (Peter Cetera) – 4:05
 "When I Need You" (Albert Hammond, Carole Bayer Sager) – 4:21
 "Knowing Me, Knowing You" (Benny Andersson, Björn Ulvaeus, Stig Anderson) – 4:21
 "Still" (Lionel Richie) – 5:09
 "When a Child is Born" (Ciro Dammicco, Fred Jay) – 3:49
 "Do That to Me One More Time" (Toni Tennille) – 4:02

Credits
Personnel
 Lead vocals by Cilla Black
 Produced by Bruce Welch
 Arranged by Mike Moran
 Engineered by Peter Vince
 Album cover photograph by Dave Magnus

Certifications

|-

References

External links
 CillaBlack.com Discography – Especially for You
 
 Cilla Black - Especially for You (1980) album review, credits & releases at AllMusic
 Cilla Black - Especially for You (1980) album releases & credits at Discogs
 Cilla Black - Especially for You (1980, Special Edition 2009 with Bonus Tracks) album to be listened as stream on Spotify

Further reading
 

1980 albums
Cilla Black albums
Albums produced by Bruce Welch